Karen Burke (born 1971) is an English footballer.

Karen Burke may also refer to:

Karen C. Burke, American legal scholar
Karen Danczuk (née Burke), British local councillor for Kingsway, Rochdale metro